The NAIA Women's Beach Volleyball Invitational is an annual invitational tournament hosted by the National Association of Intercollegiate Athletics to determine the national champion of collegiate women's beach volleyball among its members in the United States. Because the NAIA classifies women's beach volleyball as an emerging sport, the tournament is called an "invitational" rather than a "championship."

The inaugural tournament was held in 2022.

The reigning national champions are Corban, who won the first edition of the championship.

Results

Champions

See also
NCAA Beach Volleyball Championship
NAIA Women's Volleyball Championship

References

External links
NAIA Women's Beach Volleyball

Beach volleyball